Aaron Simon Daggett (June 14, 1837 – May 14, 1938) was a career United States Army officer. He was the last surviving brevet Union general of the American Civil War, and the last surviving general of any grade from the war, when he died one month shy of his 101st birthday in 1938. Daggett was nominated for appointment to the grade of brevet brigadier general, to rank from March 13, 1865, by President Andrew Johnson on February 21, 1866 and was confirmed by the United States Senate on April 10, 1866. During the war, Daggett fought at West Point, Gaines' Mill, Golding's Farm, White Oak Swamp, Second Bull Run, South Mountain, Antietam, Rappahannock Station, Fredericksburg, Battle of Gettysburg, Battle of Mine Run, Battle of the Wilderness and Battle of Cold Harbor. Daggett was a brigadier general of volunteers in the Spanish–American War. He was appointed to the brigadier general grade to rank from September 1, 1898 and was mustered out of the volunteers on November 30, 1898. He was promoted to brigadier general in the Regular Army (United States) ten days before his retirement from the army on March 2, 1901.

Early life and education 
Daggett was born in Greene, Maine, on June 14, 1837. He was the son of Yankee parents, whose Puritan ancestors came to New England as part of the Puritan migration from England in 1630. Both of Daggett's grandfathers served in the Revolutionary War.

Daggett attended Bates College (then called the Maine State Seminary) in Lewiston, Maine, in 1860. He also attended the Monmouth Academy and Maine Wesleyan Academy.

Military career

Civil War 
Daggett enlisted as a private in the 5th Maine Volunteer Infantry Regiment in April 1861, and became a second lieutenant in May 1861. He was appointed first lieutenant, June 24, 1861. He fought at the First Battle of Bull Run. He was appointed a captain, August 15, 1861.

Daggett became a major of the 5th Maine Infantry Regiment to rank from April 14, 1863. He fought at Second Fredericksburg, Gettysburg, Mine Run, the Wilderness, and Cold Harbor where he was wounded on May 30, 1864.

Daggett was mustered out of the volunteers on July 24, 1864. On January 23, 1865, he was appointed lieutenant colonel of the 5th United States Veteran Volunteer Infantry Regiment. He was appointed brevet colonel, March 3, 1865. He had brevet appointments as a major in the Regular Army for gallant and meritorious services at Rappahannock Station and as lieutenant colonel for services at the Wilderness, both to rank from March 3, 1865. He was again mustered out of the volunteers, May 10, 1865.

On February 21, 1866, President Andrew Johnson nominated Daggett for appointment to the grade of brevet brigadier general of volunteers, to rank from March 13, 1865, and the United States Senate confirmed the appointment on April 10, 1866.

Daggett believed in the abolition of slavery and fought alongside African-American soldiers during the Civil War while serving with the 5th Maine Infantry Regiment. He was also a strong supporter of the temperance movement and gave public lectures on the topic. Daggett was a member of the Presbyterian church.

Subsequent military career
On July 28, 1866, Daggett became a captain in the 16th U.S. Infantry Regiment. He was transferred to the 2nd U.S. Infantry Regiment on April 17, 1869.  He was appointed major in the 13th U.S. Infantry Regiment on February 2, 1892. He was appointed lieutenant colonel in the 25th U.S. Infantry Regiment on October 1, 1895.

In his military career after the Civil War, Aaron Daggett went on to fight in the Indian Wars, in which he received a purple heart, the Spanish–American War in China, and the Philippines and received another Purple Heart and the Gold Star. (These quoted ref. do not state awarding of the a-fore referenced Medals. Data needs to be sourced from National Military Archives.)

During the Spanish–American War, Daggett was temporarily appointed to the brigadier general grade to rank from September 1, 1898 and was mustered out of the volunteers on November 30, 1898. He was present at the Battle of San Juan Hill.

On February 21, 1900 Daggett became a brigadier general of the regular U.S. Army before retiring on March 2, 1901 to Auburn, Maine.

Death and legacy 
Aaron S. Daggett died at the age of 100 at his home in West Roxbury, Massachusetts on May 14, 1938, making him the last surviving brevet or full, substantive rank Union general of the Civil War. He was buried at Old Valley Cemetery, Greene Corner, Maine.

Daggett Terrace (Veterans Village Subdivision) in New Port Richey Florida is named after Aaron Daggett.

See also 
 List of American Civil War brevet generals (Union)
 Last surviving United States war veterans
 List of Bates College people
 Adelbert Ames, another Maine native, the last surviving General Officer of the Regular U.S. Army at his death in 1933

 Henry R. Gibson (1837–1938), Union veteran and Tennessee Governor (1895–1905). Born 6 months after Daggett and died 11 days later at 100

Notes

References 
 Eicher, John H., and David J. Eicher, Civil War High Commands. Stanford: Stanford University Press, 2001. .

Further reading 
 1861 Maine State Seminary Catalogue
 
 
 Kimberly Swick Slover, "Courage Under Fire," University of New Hampshire Magazine, Fall 2001

External links 
 Picture and Obituary of Daggett, Portland Maine, Press Herald, 8/14/1938

1837 births
1938 deaths
American abolitionists
American centenarians
Men centenarians
American military personnel of the Spanish–American War
Bates College alumni
People from Androscoggin County, Maine
People of Maine in the American Civil War
United States Army generals
Union Army officers
Activists from Maine
Kents Hill School alumni
People from West Roxbury, Boston
Military personnel from Massachusetts